Eubiodectes is an extinct genus of prehistoric bony fish that lived during the Cenomanian.

See also

 Prehistoric fish
 List of prehistoric bony fish

References

Ichthyodectiformes
Late Cretaceous fish
Prehistoric fish of Africa
Prehistoric ray-finned fish genera